Ganigan López (born 12 November 1981) is a Mexican professional boxer who held the WBC light flyweight title between 2016 and 2017.

Professional career

López turned professional in 2003 and earned his first world title opportunity in 2015 against compatriot Pedro Guevara, López would lose via unanimous decision. López would get a second opportunity at a world title and this time would be successful as he would dethrone Japanese fighter Yu Kimura.

Professional boxing record

See also
List of world light-flyweight boxing champions
List of Mexican boxing world champions

References

External links

 

1981 births
Living people
People from Amecameca
Mexican male boxers
Boxers from the State of Mexico
Mini-flyweight boxers
Light-flyweight boxers
Flyweight boxers
World light-flyweight boxing champions
World Boxing Council champions